Moeville is an unincorporated community located in the towns of Trenton and Trimbelle, in Pierce County, Wisconsin, United States.

Notes

Unincorporated communities in Pierce County, Wisconsin
Unincorporated communities in Wisconsin